Dorcas Affo-Toffey (4 May 1972) is a Ghanaian entrepreneur, philanthropist and politician. She is a member of the National Democratic Congress (NDC). She is the member of parliament for the Jomoro Constituency in the Western Region.

Early life and education 
Dorcas Affo-Toffey was born on 4 May 1972, in Tikobo No. 1 to the late Stephen Ackah Toffey and Mary Afo Danyi. She was born into a large family, the 18th born of her father's twenty-three children but the last born of her mother's five children. She had her basic school in Tikobo No. 1 and Ideal Preparatory school in Takoradi and gained admission to the Nkroful Agriculture Secondary School in 1986 where she had her secondary school education. After completing her secondary school education, she relocated to USA to join her elder brothers. During that period she studied courses on Dental hygiene, real estate management, branding and customer service.

She holds a diploma in Branding and Customer Service Management. She later furthered her education at Knutsford University College where she completed with a Bachelor of Science degree in Marketing and subsequently a Master of Business Administration (MBA) in marketing.

Career 
For over 25 years, Afo-Toffey worked in different sectors during her stay in USA. The sectors encompassed health, education administration, real estate development, entrepreneurship and philanthropy fields. From 2002 to present, she had established and managed several companies in Atlanta Georgia in USA, which included; Queen D Beauty and Topeka Properties, a building and construction firm. She is also a senior partner of Selfie Homes in Atlanta Georgia USA. She returned to Ghana in 2012 to continue her entrepreneurship career of which she is currently the chief executive officer and Country Representative for Nano Fix IT Company, and Sebastian Closet Inc respectively.

Politics

Parliamentary bid 
Affo-Toffey was elected as the National Democratic Congress parliamentary candidate for the Jomoro Constituency in August 2019. She got 1,324 votes representing 87.4% whilst the other two candidates Akatia Kwaidoo, Nda Blay Armah polled 188 representing 12.4%, 4 representing 0.2% respectively.

Affo-Toffey won the 2020 parliamentary elections for Jomoro Constituency after polling 24,356 votes representing 55.5% against the incumbent member of parliament Paul Essien of the New Patriotic Party who had 19,889 votes representing 44.95%. Since 7 January 2021, she has been one of the 40 women and the only one from the Western Region representing their respective constituencies in the 8th Parliament.

Member of Parliament 
On 7 January 2021, Affo-Tottey was sworn in as the Member of Parliament representing the Jomoro Constituency in the 8th Parliament of the 4th Republic of Ghana. She serves as a member on the Gender and Children Committee and the Lands and Forestry Committee of Parliament.

In her maiden address on the floor of parliament on 24 March 2021, she urged the government to reopen land borders which had been closed due to the COVID-19 pandemic to boost economic activities. She stressed on the urgent need to reopen and regularize land border crossing at key entry points in the Jomoro Constituency such as Elubo, Jaway wharf, Newtown, Ellenda wharf and other border towns in Ghana. This was due to having several towns in her constituency serving as boarder towns between Ghana and Ivory Coast.

Challenging her Eligibility 
After winning the 2020 Parliamentary election, Affo-Toffey was accused of holding a dual citizenship by Joshua Emuah Kofie, a resident of Nuba-Mpataba in her constituency. A court case was then instituted against her challenging her citizenship. At the last court hearing she did not show up and this led to a court bench warrant being issued against her on December 6, 2021. However, on December 9th, 2021, Affo-Toffey appeared in court with her lawyer, Edudzi Kudzo Tamaklo, and the MP for Ellembelle, Emmanuel Armah-Kofi Buah. The Sekondi Commercial Court A after short proceedings, rescinded the bench warrant instituted against her.

Sports 
On 24 March 2021, Affo-Toffey completed the purchase of the Ghana Division One League club Proud United. The club's name was changed to Jomoro FC and relocated from Accra, Greater Accra Region to Jomoro in the Western Region. The club's was set to play their home games at the Crosby Awuah Memorial Park (CAM), in Aiyinase, home grounds of Karela United following the takeover.

Personal life 
She is married to Joseph Lawrence Ashun and has two daughters: Francine Koffi (Fantana, a musician in Ghana) and Lynelle Koffi (a medical student in the USA).

References

External links 
 Official Website
 Dorcas Affo-Toffey, GhanaMPs Profile

National Democratic Congress (Ghana) politicians
21st-century Ghanaian women politicians
Living people
Ghanaian MPs 2021–2025
1972 births